I Was a Communist for the FBI is a 1951 American film noir crime film directed by Gordon Douglas and starring  Frank Lovejoy. The film was produced by Bryan Foy who was head of Warners B picture unit until 1942.

The film was based on a series of stories written by Matt Cvetic that appeared in The Saturday Evening Post. The stories were later turned into a best-selling book, and a radio show starring Dana Andrews that ran for 78 episodes from April 23, 1952, until October 14, 1953.

The story follows Cvetic, who infiltrated a local Communist Party cell for nine years and reported back to the Federal Bureau of Investigation (FBI) on their activities.

Plot
Matt Cvetic (Frank Lovejoy), who works in a Pittsburgh steel mill, has been infiltrating the Communist Party for the FBI in Pittsburgh for nine years. During this time he has been unable to tell his family about his dual role, so they assume that he is a genuine believer in communism and despise him.

He becomes emotionally involved with a Communist school teacher (Dorothy Hart), who is becoming disenchanted with the party. She breaks with the party when it foments a violent strike. Cvetic helps her escape the Communists in violent sequences in which two Communists and an FBI agent are killed.

Communists are portrayed in the film as cynical opportunists, racists who are interested only in seizing power on behalf of the Soviet Union. They are shown exploiting ethnic tensions to get their way, such as by wrapping copies of a Jewish newspaper around lead pipes used to beat up people during a strike. They also are shown fomenting discontent among blacks. They are shown as cynical racists, calling blacks "niggers" and Jews "kikes," and as violent thugs who kill informers.

Cvetic ultimately testifies against the Communists before the House Un-American Activities Committee and reconciles with his brother and son.

Cast
 Frank Lovejoy as Matt Cvetic
 Dorothy Hart as Eve Merrick
 Philip Carey as Mason
 James Millican as Jim Blandon
 Richard Webb as Ken Crowley
 Konstantin Shayne as Gerhardt Eisler
 Paul Picerni as Joe Cvetic
 Roy Roberts as Father Novac
 Edward Norris as Harmon (as Eddie Norris)
 Ron Hagerthy as Dick Cvetic
 Hugh Sanders as Clyde Garson
 Hope Kramer as Ruth Cvetic
 Lyle Latell as FBI Officer Cahill

Radio
The radio version of I Was a Communist for the FBI consisted of 78 episodes syndicated by the Frederick W. Ziv Company to more than 600 stations, including KNX in Los Angeles, California, with original episodes running from March 30, 1952, to September 20, 1953. The program was made without the cooperation of the FBI. Real-life undercover agent Matt Cvetic was portrayed by Dana Andrews. The show had a budget of $12,000 per week, a very high cost to produce a radio show at the time.

The program frequently dealt with the great stress that Cvetic was under, as he covertly infiltrated a local Communist Party cell. There were many personal and family problems caused by his being a Communist as well as a certain amount of mental torment. He saw the party as being hypocritical and a great danger to society.

In 1953, Ziv created I Led Three Lives, based on the life of Herbert Philbrick, an advertising executive who also infiltrated the U.S. Communist Party on behalf of the FBI in the 1940s. This time, the FBI approved all of the show's scripts.

Reception

Box office
According to Warner Bros, records, the film earned $1,319,000 in the U.S. and $440,000 elsewhere.

Critical response
When the film was released, The New York Times film critic Bosley Crowther was critical of the message in the film.  He wrote, "In many respects, this heated item bears comparison to the hearings before the House Un-American Activities Committee—which, incidentally, it extols...For instance, in glibly detailing how the Communists foment racial hate and labor unrest in this country...[it] hint[s] that most Negroes and most laborers are 'pinks'. It raises suspicion of school teachers...[and] that people who embrace liberal causes, such as the Scottsboro trial defense, are Communist dupes...and the film itself glows with patriotism. But it plays a bit recklessly with fire".

The staff at Variety magazine wrote a positive review: "From the real life experiences of Matt Cvetic [published in the Saturday Evening Post as "I Posed as a Communist for the F.B.I"], scripter Crane Wilbur has fashioned an exciting film. Direction of Gordon Douglas plays up suspense and pace strongly, and the cast, headed by Frank Lovejoy in the title role, punches over the expose of the Communist menace."

Accolades
This dramatic film was nominated for an Academy Award as the Best Documentary Feature of the year.

References

External links

Audio streaming
 I Was A Communist for the F.B.I. "I Walk Alone" episode, on the Ziv Television Programs: Apr 23, 1952

1951 films
1950s American radio programs
American anti-communist propaganda films
American crime drama films
American radio dramas
American black-and-white films
Films about McCarthyism
Film noir
Films directed by Gordon Douglas
Films set in Pittsburgh
Warner Bros. films
Films scored by William Lava
Films scored by Max Steiner
Ziv Company radio programs
Syndicated radio programs
1951 crime drama films
1950s English-language films
1950s American films
Red Scare